Scopula rubriceps is a moth of the family Geometridae. It was described by Warren in 1905. It is endemic to Angola.

References

Moths described in 1905
rubriceps
Endemic fauna of Angola
Insects of Angola
Moths of Africa
Taxa named by William Warren (entomologist)